New Wave is the 1993 debut album by British alternative rock band The Auteurs. In 2014, British independent record label 3 Loop Music re-released the album on 180gsm Vinyl and as a 2CD Expanded Edition which included b-sides, rarities, radio session tracks and the original 4-track demos that led to the band's signing with Hut Records.

Reception

In a retrospective review, Jake Kennedy of Record Collector said it was not the band's best effort, but considered it a "canny time capsule, bundled up with all the retro glam of the era", with a number of lyrical topics which "confuse and charm in equal measure".

The album was shortlisted for the 1993 Mercury Prize. It is now included in the 1001 Albums You Must Hear Before You Die list.

Track listing
All songs written by Luke Haines.

Original 1993 CD/LP (CDHUT7/HUTLP7)
 "Show Girl" - 4:06
 "Bailed Out" - 3:44
 "American Guitars" - 3:31
 "Junk Shop Clothes" - 2:42
 "Don't Trust the Stars" - 2:25
 "Starstruck" - 2:59
 "How Could I Be Wrong" - 3:53
 "Housebreaker" - 2:57
 "Valet Parking" - 2:55
 "Idiot Brother" - 5:45
 "Early Years" - 2:40
 "Home Again" - 3:24 / "Subculture (They Can't Find Him)" - 2:13 (hidden track; it follows 20 seconds of silence after the end of "Home Again")

Free 7" (HUTL2)
"She Might Take a Train" - 1:38
"Subculture (They Can't Find Him)" - 2:13

2014 expanded edition bonus tracks (Disc 1) 
 "Subculture (They Can't Find Him)" 
 "She Might Take a Train" 
 "Glad to Be Gone"
 "Staying Power"
 "Wedding Day"
 "High Diving Horses"

2014 Expanded Edition Bonus Tracks (Disc 2)
 "Housebreaker (Rough Trade Singles Club 7")" 
 "Valet Parking (Rough Trade Singles Club 7")" 
 "Housebreaker (Acoustic Version)" 
 "Junk Shop Clothes (Acoustic Version)" 
 "Starstruck (Acoustic Version)" 
 "Home Again (Acoustic Version)"
 "Junk Shop Clothes (1993 BBC Radio 1 Session)"
 "New French Junkshop (1993 BBC Radio 1 Session)"
 "Government Bookstore (1993 BBC Radio 1 Session)"
 "How Could I Be Wrong (1993 BBC Radio 1 Session)"
 "Bailed Out (Original 4-Track Demo)"
 "American Guitars (Original 4-Track Demo)"
 "Showgirl (Original 4-Track Demo)"
 "Glad to Be Gone (Original 4-Track Demo)"
 "Starstruck (Original 4-Track Demo)"
 "Early Years (Original 4-Track Demo)"

Personnel
Personnel per booklet.

The Auteurs
 Luke Haines – guitar, piano, vocals
 Alice Readman – bass guitar 
 Glenn Collins – drums

Additional musicians
 James Banbury – cello
 Chris Wyles – percussion
 Kuljit Bhamra – percussion
 Joe Beckett – percussion

Production
 Phil Vinall – engineer, producer
 Luke Haines – producer
 Stefan de Batselier – photography
 Peter Barrett – sleeve design
 Andrew Biscomb – sleeve design

References

External links

New Wave at YouTube (streamed copy where licensed)

1993 debut albums
The Auteurs albums
Albums produced by Phil Vinall
Hut Records albums